The trade winds are the permanent east-to-west prevailing winds that flow in the Earth's equatorial region.

Tradewind(s) or trade wind(s) may also refer to:

Media

Books 
 Trade Wind, a book by M. M. Kaye

Films 
 Trade Winds (film), 1938 film directed by Tay Garnett
 Trade Wind, alternate name for the 1998 film At Sachem Farm
 Tradewind (The Incredibles), a superhero
 Tradewind Pictures, a German production company

Music 
 The Trade Winds, a 1960s pop group
 Tradewinds, the original name of Styx
 "Trade Winds", a poem by John Masefield set to music in 1919 by Frederick Keel
 "Trade Winds", the B-side to the 1972 Roberta Flack single "The First Time Ever I Saw Your Face"
 "Tradewinds", a song from John Denver's 1977 album, I Want to Live
 "Trade Winds", a song by Natasha Barrett

Other media 
 TradeWinds, a business newspaper covering ocean shipping
 Tradewinds, a video game franchise published by Sandlot Games

Military and aviation 
 Tradewind (schooner), a 1911 Dutch tall ship
 Convair R3Y Tradewind, an American 1950s heavy transport flying-boat
 Tradewinds Airlines, an American cargo carrier
 Tradewinds Charters and Tradewinds Airlines, former names of SilkAir, a Singaporean airline
 Tradewinds Tours And Travel, a subsidiary
 Tradewinds Airways, a British cargo airline
 Tradewind Aviation, also Tradewind Shuttle, an American charter airline

Places 
 Tradewinds, Texas, a census-designated place
 Tradewinds Hotel, Ottoville, American Samoa

See also